The European Parliament election of 2014 took place in Italy on 25 May 2014.

In Aosta Valley the centre-left Democratic Party, endorsed by the Progressive Valdostan Union and Autonomy Liberty Participation Ecology, came largely ahead with 47.1% of the vote, followed by the Five Star Movement, distant second at 19.6%. The two parties forming the regional government, namely the Valdostan Union and Edelweiss, did not participate in or endorse any list. This likely favoured Lega Nord, which gained 6.8% of the vote, its best tally in the region since 1996. Among other lists, Forza Italia obtained 10.3% and The Other Europe 7.7%. PD–UVP–ALPE's Luca Barbieri was the most voted candidate in the region with 8,128 preference votes.

Results

References

Elections in Aosta Valley
European Parliament elections in Italy
2014 European Parliament election
2014 elections in Italy